The 1972 Western Michigan Broncos football team represented Western Michigan University in the Mid-American Conference (MAC) during the 1972 NCAA University Division football season.  In their ninth season under head coach Bill Doolittle, the Broncos compiled a 7–3–1 record (2–2–1 against MAC opponents), finished in third place in the MAC, and outscored their opponents, 229 to 201.  The team played its home games at Waldo Stadium in Kalamazoo, Michigan.

The team's statistical leaders included Steve Doolittle with 518 passing yards, Larry Cates with 660 rushing yards, and Bob Gavinski with 290 receiving yards. Defensive tackle Bernard Thomas and tight end Keith Pretty were the team captains. Linebacker Dominic Riggio received the team's most outstanding player award.

Schedule

References

Western Michigan
Western Michigan Broncos football seasons
Western Michigan Broncos football